Herbert Rose may refer to:

 Herbert Rose (artist) (1890–1937), Australian painter and etcher
 H. J. Rose (1883–1961), British classical scholar

See also 
 Bert Rose (1919–2001), football executive
 Herbert Rose Barraud (1845–1896), portrait photographer